The Morristown District, also known as the Morristown Historic District, is a  historic district  in the town of Morristown in Morris County, New Jersey. It was added to the National Register of Historic Places on October 30, 1973, for its significance in architecture, communications, education, military, politics, religion, social history, and transportation. The initial district listing had 50 contributing buildings, including the Thomas Nast Home and the Dr. Lewis Condict House, which were previously listed individually on the NRHP, and the Morristown Green.

History and description
Macculloch Hall was built in 1810 by George and Louisa Macculloch and features Federal architecture. The brick building is now the home of the Macculloch Hall Historical Museum. The Vail Mansion was built in 1918 by Theodore N. Vail, then president of AT&T. Built of granite and marble, it features Florentine architecture. Vail never occupied the building and he donated it to the town. The Morristown & Morris Township Library was built in 1917, with funding from Grinnell Willis, local textile merchant. St. Peter's Episcopal Church was built by the architectural firm McKim, Mead & White. Designed by architect J. Cleaveland Cady, the South Street Presbyterian Church was built in 1878. The First Presbyterian Church was built 1893–1894 featuring Romanesque Revival style. The Kedge was built in 1870 as a summer cottage and features Stick style.

Gallery

See also
 National Register of Historic Places listings in Morris County, New Jersey

References

External links
 
 

Morristown, New Jersey	
National Register of Historic Places in Morris County, New Jersey
Historic districts on the National Register of Historic Places in New Jersey
New Jersey Register of Historic Places